Kuwait competed at the 2020 Summer Olympics in Tokyo. Originally scheduled to take place from 24 July to 9 August 2020, the Games were postponed to 23 July to 8 August 2021, due to the COVID-19 pandemic. It was the nation's thirteenth appearance at the Summer Olympics, although it competed under the Independent Olympic Athletes at the previous Games in 2016, resulting to the country's suspension by the International Olympic Committee for government interference.

Medalists

Competitors
The following is the list of number of competitors in the Games.

Athletics

Kuwaiti athletes further achieved the entry standards, either by qualifying time or by world ranking, in the following track and field events (up to a maximum of 3 athletes in each event):

Track & road events

Karate
 
Kuwait received an invitation from the Tripartite Commission to send Mohammad Al-Mosawi in the men's kata category to the Olympics.

Kata

Rowing

For the first time since Seoul 1988, Kuwait qualified one boat in the men's single sculls for the Games, by achieving the top time in the C-final and securing the fourth of five berths available at the 2021 FISA Asia & Oceania Olympic Qualification Regatta in Tokyo, Japan. 
 

Qualification Legend: FA=Final A (medal); FB=Final B (non-medal); FC=Final C (non-medal); FD=Final D (non-medal); FE=Final E (non-medal); FF=Final F (non-medal); SA/B=Semifinals A/B; SC/D=Semifinals C/D; SE/F=Semifinals E/F; QF=Quarterfinals; R=Repechage

Shooting

Kuwaiti shooters achieved quota places for the following events by virtue of their best finishes at the 2018 ISSF World Championships, the 2019 ISSF World Cup series, and Asian Championships, as long as they obtained a minimum qualifying score (MQS) by May 31, 2020.

Swimming

Kuwait received a universality invitation from FINA to send two top-ranked swimmers (one per gender) in their respective individual events to the Olympics, based on the FINA Points System of June 28, 2021.

References

Nations at the 2020 Summer Olympics
2020
2021 in Kuwaiti sport